Strzelce Landscape Park (Strzelecki Park Krajobrazowy) is a protected area (Landscape Park) in eastern Poland, on the border with Ukraine.

The Park lies within Lublin Voivodeship: in Chełm County (Gmina Białopole, Gmina Dubienka) and Hrubieszów County (Gmina Horodło, Gmina Hrubieszów, Gmina Uchanie). It takes its name from the village of Strzelce in Gmina Białopole.

Within the Landscape Park are two nature reserves.

Strzelce
Parks in Lublin Voivodeship
Poland–Ukraine border